Steven Paul Croley is an American lawyer, Chief Policy Officer and General Counsel of Ford Motor Company and the Harry Burns Hutchins Collegiate Professor of Law at the University of Michigan Law School in Ann Arbor (on leave since 2010). His practice areas include law reform, legal policy, regulation, oversight, and political law, with special emphasis on energy and the environment. His academic research and writing focus on administrative law, civil procedure, good government, and regulatory policy.

Croley joined Latham & Watkins in 2017, following seven years holding senior positions in the Obama Administration. He was sworn in as general counsel of the United States Department of Energy on May 21, 2014 (having been nominated on August 1, 2013), and served in that role till January 19, 2017. Prior to joining the Department of Energy, he served in the Office of White House Counsel.  From 2012–2014, he served as deputy assistant and deputy counsel to the president for legal policy, and from 2011 to 2012 as senior counsel to the president.  He oversaw a legal team handling a wide range of domestic legal issues, including energy.  From 2010 to 2011, he served as special assistant to the president for justice & regulatory policy on the White House Domestic Policy Council. On the Domestic Policy Council, Croley had a "broad portfolio including good government and transparency issues, civil rights, food safety, and criminal justice policy."

Croley was also appointed by President Obama to serve as a council member of the Administrative Conference of the United States. He has been described as having "a genius for regulatory law."

Early life and education
Croley was born and raised in Mid-Michigan, where he attended public schools. He earned his A.B. summa cum laude and Phi Beta Kappa from the University of Michigan, where he was a James B. Angell Scholar and won the William Jennings Bryan Prize,  in 1988. Croley then earned his J.D. from Yale Law School in 1991, where he was an articles editor of the Yale Law Journal, was a John M. Olin student fellow, and won the John M. Olin Prize and Benjamin Scharps Prize. Croley served as a law clerk for Judge Stephen F. Williams of the U.S. Court of Appeals for the District of Columbia Circuit from 1991 to 1992. Croley attended graduate school at Princeton University, where he was a University Fellow and earned an M.A. in 1994 and a Ph.D. in American politics in 1998.

Scholarship
Croley began his teaching career at the University of Michigan Law School in 1993 and was granted tenure in 1998. From 2003 to 2006, he served as the associate dean for academic affairs.

At Michigan Law, Croley has taught classes in administrative law, torts, civil procedure, collective action, banking law, energy law, and regulation, suits against the state, civil justice, good government, and law and economics of regulated industries.

Croley is the author of Civil Justice Reconsidered:  Towards a Less Costly, More Accessible Civil Litigation System (New York University Press, 2017), and of Regulation and Public Interests: The Possibility of Good Regulatory Government (Princeton University Press 2008), and his work has appeared in a variety of law journals, including the Michigan Law Review, Harvard Law Review, Columbia Law Review, Administrative Law Journal, and the University of Chicago Law Review.

Croley was ranked by Brian Leiter in 2002 as being the ninth most widely cited law faculty who entered teaching since 1993.

Professional activities

Croley joined the Michigan Law faculty in 1993. From 1999 to 2006, Croley had a part-time private practice in the state and federal courts, handling a wide variety of matters. Croley served as a Special Assistant U.S. Attorney for the Eastern District of Michigan from 2006 to 2010, representing the United States in a variety of affirmative and defensive civil litigation in the federal courts.

Croley was a policy advisor for the Obama for America in 2007 and 2008, serving as convenor of the Law & Judiciary Policy Advisory Committee, co-convenor of the Government Reform Policy Advisory Committee, and surrogate on administrative law and government reform. Croley also served on the Obama-Biden Transition Team in 2008 and 2009 and on the Levin-Stabenow Eastern District of Michigan Judicial Advisory Committee in 2009. He served the Obama White House beginning in 2010, and in the US Department of Energy beginning in 2014. In 2019 and 2020, he volunteered for the Biden for President campaign, and assisted the Biden Transition team. 

Croley is admitted to the State Bar of Michigan the Illinois Bar, and the Washington DC Bar. Croley is also a member of the American Bar Association, Federal Bar Association, American Constitution Society, and American Law and Economics Association. He has served on the board of the Institute for Policy Integrity and as a member of the Tobin Project on economic regulation. He has served on the Executive Committee of the Michigan Institute of Continuing Legal Education and was its chair from 2004 to 2005. Croley serves as a peer reviewer for Regulation & Governance, the Journal of Politics; the Journal of Public Administration Research and Theory; and the Journal of Legal Studies.

Croley served as a research consultant to the U.S. Department of Labor from 1994 to 1995, to the Administrative Conference of the United States from 1994 to 1995, and the Michigan Law Revision Commission from 1996 to 1999.

Croley won Michigan Law's annual L. Hart Wright Teaching Award in 1995.

In 2004, Croley received the American Bar Association's Award for Scholarship in Administrative Law.  In 2010, he was elected into the American Law Institute.

He was the recipient of the Department of Energy's Achievement Award (2016) and Exceptional Service Award (2017).

At Latham & Watkins, he represents clients across the country and around the globe with litigation matters, regulatory matters, and transactional matters.

Personal life
Croley is married to Michigan Supreme Court Chief Justice Bridget Mary McCormack, a professor of law and former associate dean of clinical affairs at the University of Michigan Law School. The couple has four children.

Croley is a gun owner.

Notes

American lawyers
Living people
Yale Law School alumni
Year of birth missing (living people)
University of Michigan alumni
University of Michigan Law School faculty